Edwin Edgerton Aiken (March 1, 1859 – January 5, 1951) was an American Congregationalist minister and author who spent over four decades as a missionary and educator in China.

Born in Newington, Connecticut, he graduated from Yale University in 1881, where he was Phi Beta Kappa and a member of Skull and Bones. The following year he published The Secret Society System.  While not naming Skull and Bones, he objected to the exclusiveness of societies and fraternities. He wrote: "Real friendship is not the result of formal compacts and societies; the spiritual bond is the true one, covenants of friendship are unnecessary, compacts are made for different ends."
 
He earned his BD from Yale Divinity School in 1884. In 1885 he began his missionary work in China with the American Board of Commissioners for Foreign Missions, serving in Peiping (1885–90), Tientsin (1892–99), Paoting (1902–11), and Ichang (1917-21, 26-27). From 1912-1917 he was on the committee that revised the Mandarin-language translation of the Bible. When finally published, the Mandarin Union Version superseded earlier versions and became the translation of choice for Chinese Christians into the 21st century.  He was also editor of the Peking Union Church Bulletin from 1928-1943, was a member of the Peking Oriental Society and held a number of teaching posts.

Aiken and his wife left China in 1943 during the Second Sino-Japanese War. After a four-month internment by the Japanese, they were evacuated on the MS Gripsholm.

He was married twice, first in 1892 to Maud Lockwood, who died of scarlet fever in Tientsin in 1899, and second in 1902 to Rose Ethel Merrill.  With his first wife he had two sons, Reverend Edwin Edgerton Aiken Jr. and George Lockwood Aiken, and a daughter, Margery, and with his second wife a daughter, Lura Susan Aiken, wife of Erhart Friedrich Petersen.

References

External links
 "First Impressions of China" by E.E. Aiken from New Englander and Yale Review Volume 0054 Issue 254 (June 1891)
 

1859 births
1951 deaths
People from Newington, Connecticut
American Congregationalist missionaries
American male writers
American Congregationalist ministers
Yale Divinity School alumni
Writers from Connecticut
American editors
American expatriates in China
Congregationalist missionaries in China